The phrase "Malaysian Malaysia" was originally used in the mid-1960s as the rallying motto of the Malaysian Solidarity Convention, a coalition of political parties led by Lee Kuan Yew of the People's Action Party (PAP) that served as an Opposition bloc to the Government of Malaysia, the Alliance Party.

Although Lee Kuan Yew did not object to the special rights of the Malays as accorded in Article 153 of the Federal Constitution (which allows for special quotas to be allocated to the Malays and other indigenous peoples of Malaysia in admission to the public service, awarding of public scholarships, admission to public education institutions and the awarding of trade licences), he disagreed with the approach of the Alliance Party on the basis that Malay special rights alone could not solve the problem of Malay poverty. This difference in approach can be seen in Article 89 of the State Constitution of Singapore (now Article 153 of the Constitution of the Republic of Singapore) which states that the Malays are in a special position as the indigenous people of Singapore and that the Government of Singapore has a duty to safeguard their interests. Although special rights with respect to certain quotas are not specifically spelled out, free education was still given to all Malays, from primary education up until university by the government.

The rationale for affirmative action was due to the Malays and other indigenous people in Malaysia being marginalised by the British, throughout British colonial rule of Malaya and Borneo. Britain colonised the predecessor entities of Malaysia gradually throughout a period from 1786 to 1957 after the Anglo-Dutch Treaty of 1824. During these years, the British declined to employ and resettle Malay Indonesians and Malay Malaysians away from their traditional villages, as the latter groups preferred to harvest nearby paddy fields and engage in artisanal fishing; the latter groups were reluctant to work and move to new settlements around the then-newly formed tin mines and rubber plantations. As a result, the British preferred to import and employ Chinese and Indian emigrants instead, thus preventing any relocation or lifestyle disturbances to the Malays and other aborigines.

The State Government of Singapore and the Federal Government of Malaysia both agreed that the economic status of the Malays had to be alleviated, but disagreed on the approach. Although Lee Kuan Yew supported Tunku Abdul Rahman, Tun Razak, Dr. Ismail and the other primary leaders of UMNO whom wanted a gradual transition to non-communal politics, he was wary of the secondary leaders of UMNO, who he believed used Malay special rights as a red herring to divide the population along racial lines. He believed that special quotas allocated to Malays with regards to licenses and the creation of a 'Malay capitalist class' alone would only benefit the aristocrats from elite malay families and not the average malay farmer whose problems could only be solved by education and raising their standards and earning capacity, thus improving their agricultural research and techniques and could eventually propel the profession to become a lucrative job like in countries such as in Australia and New Zealand. Lee argued that if the focus was solely on creating a Malay capitalist class it would only lead to a widening of the economic gap both within the Malay community and with other communities which would lead to the non-Malays being used as the scapegoats.

The ultra malay nationalists, or 'ultras' as coined by Lee Kuan Yew were operating on the basis of the old demographics of the Federation of Malaya, where Malays made up of 65% of the vote, when in fact the demographics after the formation of Malaysia was roughly 40% Malays, 40% Chinese, 20% Indians, Eurasians and others. Additionally, Singapore, Sabah and Sarawak constituted about 35% of the seats in Parliament. Due to these state of affairs, Lee Kuan Yew decided to rally the parties from the Borneo States of Sabah and Sarawak along with like-minded parties in the States of Malaya like Penang and Malacca under the Malaysian Solidarity Convention using 'Malaysian Malaysia' as a slogan to counter the communal politics of the ultras.

Eventually, Singapore was ejected from Malaysia and affirmative action for the Malays have strengthened in policies such as the New Economic Policy. Critics have called such affirmative action for the Malays racial discrimination against other Malaysian citizens, with the goal of creating ketuanan Melayu (Malay supremacy). "Malaysian Malaysia" is not a mere tautology, because it distinguishes between nationality and ethnic classification. The complaint was that Malaysia was not being "Malaysian" and egalitarian (by discriminating against non-Malays) and was instead being an ethnocentric "Malay Malaysia".

Early use
The phrase "Malaysian Malaysia" is widely associated with Lee Kuan Yew, then leader of the Singapore-based People's Action Party (PAP), the prime constituent in the Malaysian Solidarity Convention, who was foremost a critic against the raced-based economic policy.

In a speech, Lee argued that operating on the basis of race was no substitute for sound economic policy. While he acknowledged that the Malay economic status had to be alleviated, he believed that a racial approach alone would not lead to efficient distribution of wealth across the rural class of Malays as anyone could constitutionally become a Malay by professing the religion of Islam and practice malay customs, whether they were born and bred in Malaya or not: "According to history, the Perak Man was believed to survive in Malaysia 10,000 years ago and more skeletons were found in Sarawak indicating the human living there since 3,000 – 4,000 years ago. Of the 50.1% percent Malays in Malaysia today, about one-third are comparatively new immigrants like the secretary-general of UMNO, Dato' Syed Ja'afar Albar, who came to Malaya from Indonesia just before the war at the age of more than thirty. Therefore, the supporters of "Malaysian Malaysia" argue that it is wrong and illogical for a particular ethnic group to think that they are more entitled to be called Malaysians than others, and that the others can become Malaysian only through their favour."  Lee still believed in affirmative action for the Malays who were the indigenous people, he believed that it was folly to demonise non-Malays as a crutch to win Malay support as the demographics of Malaysia were more balanced instead of the old Federation of Malaya. He asserted that using special rights as a crutch would open up a lot of loopholes which would inevitably lead to a racial and class segregation in the population which would be detrimental to Malaysia as it could be exploited to benefit the elite Malay aristocrats.

The campaign for a "Malaysian Malaysia" was not viewed highly by the government of Malaysia and the parties in the ruling coalition of the Alliance (later the Barisan Nasional). 
Those against the concept of a Malaysian Malaysia cited the fact that Malaya was progressively colonised by the British from the mid-19th century to its height in 1926. During this period, a large number of immigrant labourers, including Chinese and Indian peoples, came to Malaysia and Singapore. They suggest that during the colonial era, the Malays were forced to accommodate other peoples. Those historic immigrants and their descendants allowed to remain after the nation achieved independence should understand their presence was a privilege, not a right. Such people said that the influx of immigrants had negatively affected the rights and resources of the Malays. The argument was made in spite of the existence of Malay-Chinese Peranakans since the late 18th century, as well as regular Chinese merchant presence in Malaya long before the arrival of the British. However, the Alliance and the PAP both wanted gradual integration of a Malaysian nation, the subtle difference was in emphasis and speed. The Alliance focused on the cultural emphasis, bringing the non-Malays into the norms of the Malays through the speaking of the national language which will precipitate a national identity. The PAP focused on the economic emphasis, helping the Malays compete with the non-Malays through sound economic policy with the focus on the new Malaysian consciousness. Neither disagreed on the fundamentals (national language, special position of the Malays) but disagreed with the other on accent and timing.

The political mudslinging eventually provoked  a response from a segment of politicians in the United Malays National Organisation (UMNO) who thought Malaysian Malaysia threatened the Malays' special position in Malaysia. They considered Lee to be a dangerous and seditious trouble-maker; one politician called him a traitor to the country. The more moderate Prime Minister of Malaysia, Tunku Abdul Rahman, was perturbed by the campaign. He thought it would lead to trouble, as he believed that the Malays were not ready to compete without their special privileges. Eventually, Singapore was ejected from the Federation in 1965.

Contemporary use
In 1999, controversy was reignited when Lim Kit Siang of the Democratic Action Party (DAP, the former Malaysian branch of the PAP) called for a second campaign for a "Malaysian Malaysia". Then acting UMNO Youth Chief Hishamuddin Hussein angrily responded with a warning not to "play with fire," and accused Lim of politicising an issue that had been decided at independence with the social contract. Lim argued that the concept of a Malaysian Malaysia did not differ much from the government policy of establishing a Bangsa Malaysia (Malaysian race or Malaysian nation). Some noted that Hishamuddin's grandfather, Dato' Onn Ja'afar, the founder of UMNO, had left the party to form the Independence of Malaya Party based on the concept of eliminating special privileges for the Malays.

In 2006, at the Johor UMNO convention, Johor Menteri Besar (Chief Minister) Abdul Ghani Othman linked the "Malaysian Malaysia" campaign to those advocating the Bangsa Malaysia concept, insinuating that Bangsa Malaysia was a threat to the Bumiputra/Malay privileges granted under Article 153 of the Constitution. However, others criticised Ghani, with Deputy Prime Minister Najib Tun Razak stating: "It (Bangsa Malaysia) does not question the special rights of the Malays, our quota or anything of that sort."

1Malaysia concept

1Malaysia or One Malaysia (Malay: Satu Malaysia) is a Malaysian idea introduced by the sixth Malaysian Prime Minister, Najib Tun Razak on 5 April 2009. The main motto is People First; Performance Now (Rakyat Didahulukan, Pencapaian Diutamakan). 1Malaysia concept according to YAB Dato'Sri Mohd Najib Tun Abdul Razak explanation: "We stand, we think and act as a Malaysia race. And we take actions based on the needs of all ethnic groups in our country; ("Kita berdiri, kita berfikir dan bertindak sebagai bangsa Malaysia. Dan kita mengambil tindakan-tindakan berdasarkan kehendak semua kumpulan etnik dalam negara kita;). While 1Malaysia does not seek to do away with Article 153 of the Malaysian Constitution it does place a strong emphasis on protecting the rights and welfare of non-Malays. This means that 1Malaysia still doesn't provide an equal right for all citizens as per 1960s Malaysian Malaysia associated to Mr. Lee Kuan Yew which later then became the prime minister the Republic of Singapore. 1Malaysia concept is to harmonise citizens of the country regardless of race without changing its racial identity.

Integration under 1Malaysia is different from assimilation concept where the identity of various races were wiped out and replaced by a common national identity. Instead 1Malaysia appreciate and respect principals of Federal Constitution and ethnic identity of various races in Malaysia, and consider it as an asset or an advantage that can be proud of. 1Malaysia stressed an acceptance attitude within multi-racial citizens society, where a race/ethnic accept the racial differences of others in order for all to live together by respecting each other as a citizen in one country.

References

External links
Adam, Ramlah binti, Samuri, Abdul Hakim bin & Fadzil, Muslimin bin (2004). Sejarah Tingkatan 3. Dewan Bahasa dan Pustaka. .
Goh, Jenny (23 July 1997). "Small spark can create big mess". Straits Times.
"'Impossible to co-operate with Singapore while Lee is Premier'". (2 June 1965). Straits Times.
Khaw, Ambrose (1998). "This man is making too much noise". Retrieved 16 November 2005.
Lim, Kit Siang (1999). "Advice to Hishammuddin to abhor the old politics of bigotry and fear and set an example of the new politics of reason in Malaysia on the threshold of a new millennium". Retrieved 22 October 2004.
Wong, Douglas (21 May 1999). "Call for a 'New Malaysia'". Straits Times.

Formation of Malaysia
Malaysian political slogans
Malaysian brands
Society of Malaysia
Social history of Malaysia
Racial and religious quotas in Malaysia
History of Singapore